Tomasz Cichy (born 30 July 1976 in Poznań) is a Polish former field hockey player who competed in the 2000 Summer Olympics.

References

External links

1976 births
Living people
Polish male field hockey players
Olympic field hockey players of Poland
Field hockey players at the 2000 Summer Olympics
Sportspeople from Poznań